Psammopolia wyatti is a moth of the family Noctuidae first described by William Barnes and Foster Hendrickson Benjamin in 1926. It occurs in western North America from southern Oregon to the Queen Charlotte Islands of British Columbia. The moth has been included in both 1983 and 2010 MONA indices.

Adults fly over sand beaches, are nocturnal, and come to light.

Adults are on wing from late May to early September.

The larvae feed on Polygonum paronychia, Abronia latifolia, Tanacetum camphoratum and grass.

References

External links 
A Revision of Lasionycta Aurivillius (Lepidoptera, Noctuidae) for North America and notes on Eurasian species, with descriptions of 17 new species, 6 new subspecies, a new genus, and two new species of Tricholita Grote

Hadeninae
Moths of North America